Latvia will compete at the 2022 European Championships in Munich from August 11 to August 22, 2022.

Medallists

Competitors
The following is the list of number of competitors in the Championships:

Athletics

Beach Volleyball

Latvia has qualified 1 male and 1 female pair.

Gymnastics

Latvia has entered two male and five female athletes.

Men

Qualification

Women

Qualification

Triathlon

References

2022
Nations at the 2022 European Championships
European Championships